Bogdan Hołownia (born October 3, 1957) is a Polish jazz pianist.

He first played with Jan Wroblewski. Later in his career he played with Janusz Muniak, Adam Kawończyk, Janusz Kozłowski, Marcin Jahr, Krzysztof Mroz, Bronki Harasiuk, Kazimierz Jonkisz.

References

External links
Bogdan Hołownia's website

1957 births
Living people
Polish jazz musicians
Polish jazz pianists
21st-century pianists